James Whitney may refer to:
James Whitney (politician) (1843–1914), Canadian politician in the province of Ontario
James Whitney (filmmaker) (1921–1982)
James Amaziah Whitney (1839–1907), United States patent lawyer and writer
James Pounder Whitney (1857–1939), British historian
Jim Whitney (1857–1891), baseball player
James Scollay Whitney (1811–1878), American business executive and politician
James Lyman Whitney (1835–1910), American librarian
James Whitney (criminal) (c.1660-1694), highwayman from Stevenage